Pagodulinae  is a taxonomic subfamily of predatory sea snails, marine gastropod mollusks in the family Muricidae, the murex shells or rock shells.

The genera in this family were previously grouped in a larger subfamily, the Trophoninae.

Genera
Genera within the subfamily Pagodulinae include:
 Abyssotrophon Egorov, 1993
 Axymene Finlay, 1926
 Boreotrophon P. Fischer, 1884
 Comptella Finlay, 1926
 Enixotrophon Iredale, 1929
 Lenitrophon Finlay, 1926
 Pagodula Monterosato, 1884
 Paratrophon Finlay, 1926
 † Peritrophon Marwick, 1931
 Poirieria Jousseaume, 1880
 Terefundus Finlay, 1926
 Trophonella Harasewych & Pastorino, 2010
 Trophonopsis Bucquoy, Dautzenberg & Dollfus, 1882
 † Vesanula Finlay, 1926
 Xymene Iredale, 1915
 Xymenella Finlay, 1926
 Xymenopsis Powell, 1951
 Zeatrophon Finlay, 1926
Genera brought into synonymy
 Chalmon de Gregorio, 1885: synonym of Trophonopsis Bucquoy, Dautzenberg & Dollfus, 1882
 Enixotrophon Iredale, 1929: synonym of Pagodula Monterosato, 1884
 Houartiella Smriglio, Mariottini & Bonfitto, 1997: synonym of Trophonopsis Bucquoy, Dautzenberg & Dollfus, 1882
 Lenitrophon Finlay, 1926: synonym of Xymene Iredale, 1915
 Pinon de Gregorio, 1885: synonym of Pagodula Monterosato, 1884

References

  Barco A., Schiaparelli S., Houart R., Oliverio M. (2012). Cenozoic evolution of Muricidae (Mollusca, Neogastropoda) in the Southern Ocean, with the description of a new subfamily. Zoologica Scripta, vol. 41, p. 596-616, 

 
Muricidae